In mathematics, Kostant's convexity theorem, introduced by ,  states that the projection of every coadjoint orbit of a connected compact Lie group into the dual of a Cartan subalgebra is a convex set. It is a special case of a more general result for symmetric spaces. They proved that the projection onto the diagonal matrices of the space of all n by n complex self-adjoint matrices with given eigenvalues Λ = (λ1, ..., λn) is the convex polytope with vertices all permutations of the coordinates of Λ.

Kostant used this to generalize the Golden–Thompson inequality to all compact groups.

Compact Lie groups

Symmetric spaces
Let G be a compact Lie group and σ an involution with K a compact subgroup fixed by σ and containing the identity component of the fixed point subgroup of σ. Thus G/K is a symmetric space of compact type. Let  be the −1 eigenspace of σ and let  be a maximal Abelian subspace.

The case of a compact Lie group is the special case where G = K × K, K is embedded diagonally and σ is the automorphism of G interchanging the two factors.

Proof for a compact Lie group
There is an elementary proof just for compact Lie groups using similar ideas, due to : it is based on a generalization of the Jacobi eigenvalue algorithm to compact Lie groups.

In particular the component in the α root space—its "α off-diagonal coordinate"—can be sent to 0. In performing this latter operation, the distance from P(Y) to P(Ad(k)⋅Y) is bounded above by size of the α off-diagonal coordinate of Y. Let m be the number of positive roots, half the dimension of K/T. Starting from an arbitrary Y1 take the largest off-diagonal coordinate and send it to zero to get Y2. Continue in this way, to get a sequence (Yn). Then

Thus P⊥(Yn) tends to 0 and

Since Yn = P(Yn) ⊕ P⊥(Yn), Yn tends to X. On the other hand, Xn lies on the line segment joining Xn+1 and its reflection in the root α. Thus Xn lies in the Weyl group polytope defined by Xn+1. These convex polytopes are thus increasing as n increases and hence P(Y) lies in the polytope for X. This can be repeated for each Z in the K-orbit of X. The limit is necessarily in the Weyl group orbit of X and hence P(Ad(K)⋅X) is contained in the convex polytope defined by W(X).

To prove the opposite inclusion, take X to be a point in the positive Weyl chamber. Then all the other points Y in the convex hull of W(X) can be obtained by a series of paths in that intersection moving along the negative of a simple root. (This matches a familiar picture from representation theory: if by duality X corresponds to a dominant weight λ, the other weights in the Weyl group polytope defined by λ are those appearing in the irreducible representation of K with highest weight λ. An argument with lowering operators shows that each such weight is linked by a chain to λ obtained by successively subtracting simple roots from λ.) Each part of the path from X to Y can be obtained by the process described above for the copies of SU(2) corresponding to simple roots, so the whole convex polytope lies in P(Ad(K)⋅X).

Other proofs
For compact groups,  and  showed that if M is a symplectic manifold with a Hamiltonian action of a torus T with Lie algebra , then the image of the moment map

is a convex polytope with vertices in the image of the fixed point set of T (the image is a finite set).

the restriction of the orthogonal projection. So the convexity properties of the moment map imply that the image is the convex polytope with these vertices.  gave a simplified direct version of the proof using moment maps.

 showed that a generalization of the convexity properties of the moment map could be used to treat the more general case of symmetric spaces. Let τ be a smooth involution of M which takes the symplectic form ω to −ω and such that t ∘ τ = τ ∘ t−1. Then M and the fixed point set of τ (assumed to be non-empty) have the same image under the moment map.

Let τ be the map τ(Y) =  − σ(Y). The map above has the same image as that of the fixed point set of τ, i.e. Ad(K)⋅X. Its image is the convex polytope with vertices the image of the fixed point set of T on Ad(G)⋅X, i.e. the points w(X) for w in W = NK(T)/CK(T).

Further directions

Notes

References

Lie groups
Lie algebras
Homogeneous spaces
Mathematical theorems